DEXCON is a five-day gaming convention, held annually every July in Morristown, New Jersey, run by Double Exposure, Inc. It has a reputation for attracting leading game industry talent to participate,
 and hosts several national and world gaming championships.

It includes a number of different departments hosting multiple types of gaming, including board gaming, Larping, video gaming, and wargaming. It also hosts a number of special events and new game releases.

DEXCONs 1 through 6 were held yearly from 1992 to 1997. After a seven-year hiatus, the convention returned to an annual schedule in 2004.

References

External links
DEXCON 20 Official Website

Gaming conventions